Bushra Rahman (29 August 1944 – 7 February 2022) was a Pakistani politician who served as member of the National Assembly of Pakistan from 2002 to 2013. She remained a member of the Provincial Assembly of the Punjab from 1985 to 1990.

Early life and education
Born in the British Raj and moved to Pakistan, Rahman earned the degrees of Bachelor of Education and Master of Arts.

She was a writer by profession and was a recipient of the Sitara-i-Imtiaz for her achievements in the literature field.

Political career
Rahman was elected to the Provincial Assembly of the Punjab on a reserved seat for women in the 1985 Pakistani general election.

She was re-elected to the Provincial Assembly of the Punjab on a reserved seat for women in the 1988 Pakistani general election.

She was elected to the National Assembly of Pakistan as a candidate of Pakistan Muslim League (Q) on a seat reserved for women from Punjab in the 2002 Pakistani general election.

She was re-elected to the National Assembly of Pakistan as a candidate of Pakistan Muslim League (Q) on a seat reserved for women from Punjab in the 2008 Pakistani general election.

Personal life and death
Rahman died on 7 February 2022, at the age of 77.

Novels 
Allah Mian Ji
Bahisht
Barah e Raast
But Shikan
Chaand Say Na Khelo
Chara Gar
Chup
Ek Aawara Ki Khatir
Khubsurat
Kis Morr Par Milay Ho
Laazawal
Lala Sehrai
Lagan
Pyaasi
Sharmeely
Tere Sung Dar Ki Talaash Thi
Tuk Tuk Deedam Tokyo

References

1944 births
2022 deaths
21st-century Pakistani women politicians
Pakistani MNAs 2002–2007
Women members of the National Assembly of Pakistan
Pakistani MNAs 2008–2013
Recipients of Sitara-i-Imtiaz
Punjab MPAs 1985–1988
Punjab MPAs 1988–1990
20th-century Pakistani women politicians